Yelena Usarova (born 8 June 1982) is a Uzbekistani rower. She competed in the women's single sculls event at the 2004 Summer Olympics.

References

1982 births
Living people
Uzbekistani female rowers
Olympic rowers of Uzbekistan
Rowers at the 2004 Summer Olympics
People from Qashqadaryo Region